Kate Robinson (born December 8, 1978 in Peoria, Illinois) is an American former ice dancer. With partner Peter Breen, she won the bronze medal at the 1997 U.S. Figure Skating Championships. They finished fourth at the U.S. Championships in 1995 and 1996 but missed out on a trip to the 1998 Winter Olympics when they finished fifth at that year's Nationals.

Results 
GP: Champions Series (Grand Prix)

References

American female ice dancers
1978 births
Living people
21st-century American women